The  Norway lunar sample displays  are two commemorative plaques consisting of small fragments of Moon specimen brought back with the Apollo 11 and Apollo 17 lunar missions and given in the 1970s to the people of the Kingdom of Norway by United States President Richard Nixon as goodwill gifts.

Description

Apollo 11

Apollo 17

History 
The Apollo 11 goodwill display given to Norway was placed in the Norwegian University of Science and Technology Museum of Science at Trondheim, Norway.

The Norway Apollo 17 "goodwill Moon rocks" plaque display is alarmed and exhibited at the geological collection of the Natural History Museum at the University of Oslo.

See also
 List of Apollo lunar sample displays

References

Further reading

External links

 Partial list of Apollo  11, 12, 14, 15, 16, and 17 sample locations, NASA Johnson Space Center

Stolen and missing moon rocks
Norway–United States relations
Science and technology in Norway